Fort Randolph in Panama was a Coast Artillery Corps fort built to defend the northern end of the Panama Canal in conjunction with Fort Sherman.

History
Fort Randolph was built on Margarita Island which had been connected to the mainland by a railway causeway, so that the eastern breakwater of Limon Bay could be built.  Like most of the Panama forts, construction began in 1913 and the breakwater was complete in 1916.  The fort itself was completed on 9 April 1920 and named after Major General Wallace F. Randolph.  After World War I, emplacements were added for the M1920 railway guns.  These emplacements were located east of Battery Tidball.

Batteries
The following batteries were built on the fort.
 Tidball, four -12-inch mortars, (John C. Tidball)
 Zalinski, four -12-inch mortars
 Webb, two 14-inch Disappearing gun
 Weed, two 6-inch Disappearing gun
 four 75-mm guns
 four 155-mm guns
 Two emplacements for the 14-inch M1920 railway guns

See also
 Coastal artillery
 List of United States Army installations in Panama
 Coco Solo
 Panama Canal Railway
 Naval Base Panama Canal Zone

References

External links

 Wikimapia map of Fort Randolph
 "Gun Train Guards Ends of Panama Canal -- Rolling Fort Crosses Isthmus in Two Hours" Popular Mechanics, December 1934 pp.844-845 excellent drawings in article on the 14-inch M1920 railway gun

Closed installations of the United States Army
Military installations of the United States in Panama
Panama Canal